Mankote is a village and tehsil in Poonch district of the Indian union territory of Jammu and Kashmir. The village is located 91 kilometres from the district headquarters in Poonch.

Demographics
According to the 2011 census of India, Mankote has 956 households. The literacy rate of Mankote was 54.53% compared to 67.16% of Jammu and Kashmir. Male literacy stands at 66.31% while the female literacy rate was 42.92%.

Transport

Road
Mankote is connected by road to other places in Jammu and Kashmir by the NH 144A and other roads passing through Balnoi

Rail
The nearest major railway stations to Mankote are Jammu Tawi railway station and Awantipora railway station located at a distance of 246 kilometres and 184 kilometres respectively.

Air
The nearest airport to Mankote is Srinagar International Airport located at a distance of 210 kilometres.

See also
Jammu and Kashmir
Poonch district
Poonch

References

Villages in Mankote tehsil